Kumbakudi Sudhakaran (born 7 June 1948) is an Indian politician  and  president of the Kerala Pradesh Congress Committee (KPCC). He was also the former Cabinet Minister in the Government of Kerala. He is currently serving as Member of Parliament (MP), Lok Sabha from Kannur, Kerala and member of Parliamentary Standing Committees on Rural Development and Welfare of OBCs. He represents the Indian National Congress Party. He was also a four-term member in the Kerala Legislative Assembly and represented the Kannur constituency from 1996 to 2009.

Personal life 
K. Sudhakaran was born on 7 June 1948 in a small village called Nadal in Kannur district. Shri V. Ramunni and Smt. K. Madhavi are his parents. He completed M.A.,
LL.B. and also graduated in B.A. in History from Government Brennen College, Thalassery.

Political timeline 

 2019 : Elected to 17th Lok Sabha from Kannur where he defeated P.K.Sreemathy of CPIM by a margin of 94,559 votes.
 2009 : Elected to 15th Lok Sabha from Kannur where he defeated K. K. Rajesh of CPIM by a margin of 43151 votes
 2009 : Member, Committee on Public Accounts and Member, Committee on Commerce
 2001-2004 : Minister of Forest and Wildlife, Government of Kerala
 2001 : Minister, Forest, and Sports, Govt. of Kerala
 1992 : Member, Kerala Legislative Assembly, 1992–2009 in Kannur constituency.

References

Members of the Kerala Legislative Assembly
Living people
1948 births
India MPs 2009–2014
Lok Sabha members from Kerala
People from Kannur district
Indian National Congress politicians from Kerala
India MPs 2019–present